Millstone Coffee was a brand of coffee sold in the US, a division of The J.M. Smucker Company.  The company sold whole bean and ground coffee in retail settings and on its website.

History
The company was founded in Everett, Washington, in 1981. Founder Phil Johnson sold 100-pound sacks of Arabica beans to high-end coffee shops in the greater Seattle area, and pioneered the idea of selling whole-beaned coffees to supermarkets.

Johnson sold the company to Procter & Gamble in 1996, which closed down most of the Everett operation and runs the company from Ohio. Johnson took the assets P&G did not purchase and created the Cascade Coffee company, which continues to do business in Everett.

Expansion
In January, 2008, Procter & Gamble announced plans to create an independent company named The Folgers Coffee Company. The company consisted of three segments: Retail, Commercial, and Millstone.

On November 6, 2008, The J. M. Smucker Company announced the completion of its merger with The Folgers Coffee Company. On September 9, 2016, J.M. Smucker Co. announced its decision to discontinue the Millstone brand, citing 'lack of sustainable demand'.

References

External links

Custom Coffee Sleeves

Coffee brands
The J.M. Smucker Co. brands
Food and drink companies established in 1981